The Paradise Virus is a 2003 thriller film directed by Brian Trenchard-Smith shot on Grand Turk Island. The film sold widely and the producers later worked with Trenchard-Smith on Long Lost Son (2006).

References

External links
 

2003 television films
American horror thriller films
2003 horror films
2003 films
2000s horror thriller films
American horror television films
Films about viral outbreaks
Films directed by Brian Trenchard-Smith
2000s American films